V36 may refer to:
 a Nissan car : see Nissan Skyline#V36
 Fokker V.36, an aircraft fighter
 V.36, a telecommunications recommendation of the ITU-T